This is a list of members of the Western Australian Legislative Assembly between the 1908 elections and the 1911 elections, together known as the Seventh Parliament.

Notes
 Following the 1908 state election, Ministerial member Henry Gregory, who had won the seat of Menzies by just 7 votes against Labor's Richard Buzacott, faced a by-election after a petition was lodged against his return. He was returned at the by-election on 20 November 1908 with a majority of 56 votes against the same opponent.
 The member for Murray, John McLarty, died on 6 January 1909. William George, a former member for Murray, won the resulting by-election on 4 February 1909.
 James Mitchell, member for Northam, was appointed by Premier Newton Moore as Minister for Lands and Agriculture on 14 May 1909. Mitchell was therefore required to resign and contest a ministerial by-election on 3 June 1909, in which he was successful.
 John Nanson, member for Greenough, was appointed by Premier Newton Moore as Minister for Education and Attorney-General in June 1909. Nanson was therefore required to resign and submit to a ministerial by-election on 8 July 1909, at which he was returned unopposed.
 The Ministerial member for Albany, Edward Barnett, resigned in September 1909. The Labor candidate, William Price, won the resulting by-election on 17 September 1909.
 On 26 October 1909, Frederick Henry Piesse resigned his seat of Katanning. His brother Arnold Piesse was returned unopposed at the resulting by-election on 12 November 1909.
 Peter O'Loghlen, the Labor member for Forrest, resigned his seat in March 1910 to contest the seat of Swan at the 1910 federal election on 13 April. Dennis Jones, the Labor candidate and president of the Amalgamated Timber Association, was elected unopposed on 23 March 1910, but resigned on 20 June before being sworn in. O'Loghlen contested a second by-election for Forrest on 8 July 1910, at which he was successful.
 On 21 May 1910, James Price died, leaving the seat of Fremantle vacant. William Murphy was elected at the resulting by-election on 9 June 1910.
 On 18 June 1910, William Butcher, the member for Gascoyne, resigned in consequence of having sold some land to the Government at Avondale Estate near Beverley. He was returned unopposed in the resulting by-election when nominations closed on 28 June 1910.
 On 12 April 1910, the member for Beverley, John Marquis Hopkins, was jailed for five years for uttering. On 28 July, his seat was formally declared vacant by means of disqualification from membership of the Legislative Assembly, and Nat Harper won the resulting by-election on 15 August 1910.
 Henry Daglish, member for Subiaco, was appointed by the new Premier Frank Wilson as Minister for Works on 16 September 1910. Daglish was therefore required to resign and submit to a ministerial by-election, at which he was returned unopposed when nominations closed on 24 September 1910.
 The Ministerial member for Bunbury, former Premier Newton Moore, resigned on 13 February 1911 after being appointed Agent-General of Western Australia in London. The Labor candidate, William Lemen Thomas, won the resulting by-election on 1 March 1911, but as the last sitting of the Seventh Parliament had concluded, he did not take up his seat until being re-elected at the general election on 3 October.

Sources
 
 
 
 Western Australian Government Gazettes for 1909, 1910 and 1911; Indexed under "Electoral".

Members of Western Australian parliaments by term